"Hang Fire" is a song by the English rock and roll band the Rolling Stones from their 1981 album Tattoo You.

Written by Mick Jagger and Keith Richards, "Hang Fire" is a fast-paced, up-tempo rock and roll track, which belies the happy beat with sharp, satirical lyrics directed squarely at England's economic decline through the 1970s.

The lyrics lament an unemployed working-class Englishman who would rather bet the horses than try to marry into the upper class, the only way to get ahead in English society.

The song is one of the few times the band wrote an overtly political song, and it is notable that it was never released as a single in England, even though the band was touring Europe during the single's North American release. The lyrical irony and commentary on English society harks back to some of the group's more socially contentious songs of the sixties such as "Mother's Little Helper", "19th Nervous Breakdown" and "Street Fighting Man".

Richards was asked about the track in a 1981 Rolling Stone magazine interview where he admits the track relates to England and the "ugly politicians" who had caused the country to decline when the "money got tight".

Billboard called it "an effervescent rocker." Record World called it "no-nonsense rock n' roll, sweetened by a falsetto chorus" and commented on "Keith Richards' economical guitar break and the hot hook."

The title expression "hang fire" (by formal definition) means to do nothing, to delay, wait, hold back, or hesitate. The phrase originally denoted the instance when a gun, using an antique type of ignition such as percussion cap, or flintlock, would fail or markedly delay to fire when the trigger was pulled.

"Hang Fire" was first written and recorded during the Some Girls sessions in Paris. Released as the third single from Tattoo You, the song became a radio hit in the US, where it reached No. 20 on the singles chart. The song was played heavily on the Stones' tours of 1981 and 1982, but has been played scarcely since. Its B-side, "Neighbours", would become an airplay hit and a video was also made for the song.

Uses in popular culture
"Hang Fire" is heard in edited form in the 2010 movie The Bounty Hunter.

References

External links
 Official video (YouTube)

The Rolling Stones songs
1981 songs
1982 singles
Songs written by Jagger–Richards
Song recordings produced by Jagger–Richards
Music videos directed by Michael Lindsay-Hogg